ITU or Itu may refer to:

Organizations 
 International Telecommunication Union (formerly International Telegraph Union), an agency of the United Nations

Places
 Itu, São Paulo, a municipality in Brazil
 Itu River, Brazil
 Yidu or Itu, Yichang, Hubei, China
 Itu, Nigeria

Schools

 Information Technology University, Pakistan
 International Technological University, in San Jose, California
 Istanbul Technical University, Turkey
 IT University of Copenhagen, Denmark
 Instytut Techniczny Uzbrojenia, predecessor of the Military Institute of Armament Technology, Poland

Other uses
 Itu (surname)
 ITU TV, a Turkish television station
 Institute for Transuranium Elements, in Karlsruhe, Germany
 Intensive treatment unit, intensive therapy unit, or intensive care unit, a hospital department
 International Triathlon Union
 International Typographical Union, a labor union

See also
 ITU country code (disambiguation)
 ITU-R (ITU Radiocommunication Sector), a sector of the International Telecommunication Union
 ITU-T (ITU Telecommunication Standardization Sector), a sector of the International Telecommunication Union